Amarogentin is a chemical compound found in gentian (Gentiana lutea) or in Swertia chirata.

Gentian root has a long history of use as a herbal bitter in the treatment of digestive disorders and is an ingredient of many proprietary medicines. The bitter principles of gentian root are secoiridoid glycosides amarogentin and gentiopicrin. The former is one of the most bitter natural compounds known and is used as a scientific basis for measuring bitterness. In humans, it activates the bitter taste receptor TAS2R50. The biphenylcarboxylic acid moiety is biosynthesized by a polyketide-type pathway, with three units of acetyl-CoA and one unit of 3-hydroxybenzoyl-CoA, this being formed from an early shikimate pathway intermediate and not via cinnamic or benzoic acid.

It also shows an antileishmanial activity in animal models being an inhibitor of topoisomerase I.

References

Bitter compounds
Iridoid glycosides
Topoisomerase inhibitors